Cheshmeh Sefid (also Romanized as Cheshmeh Sefīd and Chashmeh Safīd) is a village in Galehzan Rural District, in the Central District of Khomeyn County, Markazi Province, Iran. At the 2006 census, its population was 29, in 11 families.

References 

Populated places in Khomeyn County